In mathematics, especially in algebraic geometry and the theory of complex manifolds, the adjunction formula relates the canonical bundle of a variety and a hypersurface inside that variety. It is often used to deduce facts about varieties embedded in well-behaved spaces such as projective space or to prove theorems by induction.

Adjunction for smooth varieties

Formula for a smooth subvariety
The conormal exact sequence for i is

where Ω denotes a cotangent bundle. The determinant of this exact sequence is a natural isomorphism

where  denotes the dual of a line bundle.

The particular case of a smooth divisor
Suppose that D is a smooth divisor on X. Its normal bundle extends to a line bundle  on X, and the ideal sheaf of D corresponds to its dual .

In terms of canonical classes, this says that

Both of these two formulas are called the adjunction formula.

Examples

Degree d hypersurfaces 
Given a smooth degree  hypersurface  we can compute its canonical and anti-canonical bundles using the adjunction formula.

Complete intersections 

Curves in a quadric surface 
 embeds into  as a quadric surface given by the vanishing locus of a quadratic polynomial coming from a non-singular symmetric matrix. Then, using the adjunction formula, a curve defined by the vanishing locus of a section , can be computed as

Poincaré residue 

The restriction map  is called the Poincaré residue. Suppose that X is a complex manifold.  Then on sections, the Poincaré residue can be expressed as follows. Fix an open set U on which D is given by the vanishing of a function f. Any section over U of  can be written as s/f, where s is a holomorphic function on U. Let η be a section over U of ωX. The Poincaré residue is the map

that is, it is formed by applying the vector field ∂/∂f to the volume form η, then multiplying by the holomorphic function s. If U admits local coordinates z1, ..., zn such that for some i, ∂f/∂zi ≠ 0, then this can also be expressed as

Another way of viewing Poincaré residue first reinterprets the adjunction formula as an isomorphism

Inversion of adjunction 
The adjunction formula is false when the conormal exact sequence is not a short exact sequence. However, it is possible to use this failure to relate the singularities of X with the singularities of D. Theorems of this type are called inversion of adjunction. They are an important tool in modern birational geometry.

The Canonical Divisor of a Plane Curve
Let  be a smooth plane curve cut out by a degree  homogeneous polynomial . We claim that the canonical divisor is  where  is the hyperplane divisor.

First work in the affine chart .
We will explicitly compute the divisor of the differential

At any point  either  so  is a local parameter or
  so  is a local parameter.
Thus all contributions to the divisor  are at the line at infinity, .

Now look on the line . The equation of the curve becomes 

 

Hence 

so 

with order of vanishing . Hence  which agrees with the adjunction formula.

Applications to curves
The genus-degree formula for plane curves can be deduced from the adjunction formula. Let C ⊂ P2 be a smooth plane curve of degree d and genus g. Let H be the class of a hyperplane in P2, that is, the class of a line. The canonical class of P2 is −3H. By the Riemann–Roch theorem, g − 1 = (d−3)d − g + 1, which implies the formula

Similarly, if C is a smooth curve on the quadric surface P1×P1 with bidegree (d1,d2) (meaning d1,d2 are its intersection degrees with a fiber of each projection to P1), since the canonical class of P1×P1 has bidegree (−2,−2), the adjunction formula shows that the canonical class of C is the intersection product of divisors of bidegrees (d1,d2) and (d1−2,d2−2).

The genus of a curve C which is the complete intersection of two surfaces D and E in P3 can also be computed using the adjunction formula. Suppose that d and e are the degrees of D and E, respectively. By the Riemann–Roch theorem, this implies that the genus of C is

The Riemann–Roch theorem implies that the genus of this curve is

In low dimensional topology 

Let S be a complex surface (in particular a 4-dimensional manifold) and let  be a smooth (non-singular) connected complex curve. Then 

where  is the genus of C,  denotes the self-intersections and  denotes the Kronecker pairing .

See also 
 Logarithmic form
 Poincare residue
 Thom conjecture

References

 Intersection theory 2nd edition, William Fulton, Springer, Example 3.2.12.
 Principles of algebraic geometry, Griffiths and Harris, Wiley classics library,  pp 146–147.
 Algebraic geometry, Robin Hartshorne, Springer GTM 52, Proposition II.8.20.

Algebraic geometry